Hypotia infulalis is a species of snout moth in the genus Hypotia. It was described by Julius Lederer in 1858 and is known from Spain, Portugal, Sardinia, Syria and Algeria.

References

Moths described in 1858
Hypotiini
Moths of Europe